Echo of Barbara is a 1960 British crime film directed by Sidney Hayers, and based on a novel of the same title by Jonathan Burke. It concerns Soho stripper Paula, who poses as Barbara, the missing sister of crooked Sam Roscoe, hoping to uncover the whereabouts of stolen money.

Cast
Mervyn Johns as Sam Roscoe
Maureen Connell as Paula Brown
Paul Stassino as Caledonia
Ronald Hines as Mike Roscoe
Tom Bell as Ben
Brian Peck as Ted
Eddie Leslie as Aide
Beatrice Varley as Mrs. Roscoe
John Abineri as Rankin
Diana Potter as Pam

Critical reception
Allmovie called it "a better-than-usual British programmer, entertaining despite its surplus of unpleasant leading characters."

References

External links
Echo of Barbara at BFI
 
Echo of Barbara at Letterbox DVD

1960 films
British crime films
British black-and-white films
1960 crime films
Films set in London
Films directed by Sidney Hayers
Films shot at Beaconsfield Studios
1960s English-language films
1960s British films